Arthur Haythorne Studd (19 November 1863 – 26 January 1919) was an English first-class cricketer, painter and art collector.

The son of Edward Studd and his second wife, Dorothy, he was born in November 1863 at Billesdon, Leicestershire. He was educated at Eton College, before going up to King's College, Cambridge. Although he did not play first-class cricket for Cambridge University Cricket Club, he did play for A. J. Webbe's personal XI against Cambridge University in 1885. He graduated from Cambridge in 1888, having played three first-class matches for the Marylebone Cricket Club during his final year, in addition to making a fourth appearance for the MCC in 1888. In five first-class matches, Studd scored 104 runs with a high score of 47. He played minor matches for Hampshire in 1888, then considered a second-class county.

Studd's main interest was art and he studied in Paris in at the Académie Julian in 1888–89. He met and befriended Paul Gauguin in 1890 and in 1892 he met the artist James McNeill Whistler, with the two becoming neighbours in 1894 when they moved to Chelsea, London. He travelled with Gauguin to Papeete in Tahiti in 1897–98. He later acquired a number of Whistler's works, leaving them to the Tate Gallery. Studd himself exhibited his own art regularly in the first decade of the 1900s, with some his works also held by the Tate Gallery. Studd's brothers, known colloquially as the Studd brothers, all played first-class cricket. Studd died at Marylebone in January 1919.

See also
Studd brothers

References

External links

1863 births
1919 deaths
People from Harborough District
Cricketers from Leicestershire
People educated at Eton College
Alumni of King's College, Cambridge
English cricketers
A. J. Webbe's XI cricketers
Marylebone Cricket Club cricketers
Académie Julian alumni
English expatriates in France
English male painters
English art collectors
19th-century English painters
20th-century English painters
British expatriates in French Polynesia
20th-century English male artists
19th-century English male artists